The Stanstead is a historic apartment building located at 19 Ware Street in Cambridge, Massachusetts.  The three story Richardsonian Romanesque building was built in 1887, and is an uncommon brick rendition of a triple decker, more typically a wood-frame construction, that was just becoming popular in Cambridge.  The architects, J. R. & W. P. Richards, also designed The Jarvis, another early brick apartment house in the city.

The building was listed on the National Register of Historic Places in 1986.

See also
National Register of Historic Places listings in Cambridge, Massachusetts

References

Apartment buildings on the National Register of Historic Places in Massachusetts
Triple-decker apartment houses
Buildings and structures in Cambridge, Massachusetts
Residential buildings completed in 1887
National Register of Historic Places in Cambridge, Massachusetts